Infantry Online is a multiplayer combat video game. Originally released in 1999, the game was taken offline by Sony Online Entertainment and the servers shut down in March 2012. The Infantry community subsequently took control of the game and re-launched it independently at freeinfantry.com.

Gameplay 
Infantry Online uses sprite animation graphics to model complex soldier, ground vehicle and space-ship models on typically complex terrains. Players may choose from a list of game zones to enter, each zone having a unique style of gameplay and many offering a wide diversity of weapons, player classes and objectives.

History 
In 1997, the now-defunct development team Virgin Interactive Entertainment (VIE) released the 2D Space Shooter, SubSpace. Members of the SubSpace development formed Harmless Games LLC and developed Infantry during the late 1990s. Brainscan Development Corporation, also known as Brainscan Interactive, became publisher until GameFan, the parent company of Brainscan Interactive, went bankrupt.

On October 5, 2000 Sony Online Entertainment (SOE) announced its acquisition of Infantry. Harmless Games, and its sole game, Infantry, was bought by SOE from Brainscan Interactive for an undisclosed sum. Infantry lead designer Rod Humble, together with other developers, was offered a job with SOE to continue development of the game. Cosmic Rift (CR), meant to compete with the still popular SubSpace, was developed as an offshoot of Infantry.

In May 2002, SOE introduced a monthly $6.95 pay-to-play system for SOE's three small action games: Infantry, CR and Tanarus; however, both Infantry and Cosmic Rift remained free to play with limitations.

Starting on June 26, 2007, SOE gave full and free online gaming access to Infantry and the rest of their "Station Pass" games.

On February 29, 2012, via mass-email, Sony Online Entertainment said that they would shut down the Infantry Online servers at the end of March.

References

External links 
 

1999 video games
Massively multiplayer online games
Sony Interactive Entertainment games
Video games developed in the United States
Windows games
Windows-only games
Inactive massively multiplayer online games